Sinaeschnidia (meaning "Chinese Aeschnidium") is a genus of prehistoric dragonfly. S. heishankowensis is a common component of the Jehol Biota of northeastern China. It is known from numerous specimens, both nymphs and imagos (adults). S. martinezdelclosi is known from slightly earlier deposits in Las Hoyas, Spain.

References

Dragonflies
Cretaceous insects
Cretaceous insects of Asia